Korofina is a district of Bamako in Mali.

Transport 

It is served by a station on the Dakar-Niger Railway extending past Bamako.

See also 

 Railway stations in Mali

References 

Bamako